Sydax gibbus is a species of beetle in the family Cerambycidae. It was described by Joly in 1985.

References

Neoibidionini
Beetles described in 1985